Fudoyatsu-ike Dam  is an earthfill dam located in Ibaraki Prefecture in Japan. The dam is used for irrigation. The dam impounds about 5  ha of land when full and can store 222 thousand cubic meters of water. The construction of the dam was started on 1969 and completed in 1978.

See also
List of dams in Japan

References

Dams in Ibaraki Prefecture